The Confederation of British Industry (CBI) is a UK business organisation, which in total claims to speak for 190,000 businesses, this is made up of around 1,500 direct members and 188,500 non-members. The non members are represented through the 140 trade associations within the confederation, whose separate and individual memberships the CBI claims to also speak for. Trade Association member companies, are not directly consulted or involved in CBI's policy formulation. The National Farmers' Union with its 55,000 members is the largest component of the 188,500 non-members the CBI claims to speak for. The Country Land and Business association brings another 30,000 non-members, the Association of Independent Professionals and the Self-Employed 20,000 non-members, the Freight Transport Association 13,000, the Federation of Master Builders 9,500, the Road Haulage Association 8,100 and the National Federation of Builders 1,400.

Members include companies as well as trade association members, from the perspective of their leadership. Described by the Financial Times as "Britain's biggest business lobby group". Incorporated by royal charter its mission is to promote the conditions in which businesses of all sizes and sectors in the UK can compete and prosper for the benefit of all. Its membership includes companies from the FTSE 100, mid-caps, SMEs, privately owned businesses, trade associations, universities and other public bodies. The CBI has members in many sectors: agriculture, automotive, aerospace, construction, creative, education, financial services, IT, manufacturing, professional services, retail, transport, tourism and utilities.

Role
The CBI works to promote business interests by lobbying and advising governments, networking with other businesses and creating intelligence through analysis of government policies and compilation of statistics, both in the United Kingdom and internationally through their offices in Beijing, Brussels, New Delhi and Washington, D.C.

The organisation is non-partisan and has sought legal advice to ensure neutrality.

Structure
The most recent Director-General was Tony Danker, who assumed the role on 30 November 2020, but had to step aside after misconduct allegations in March 2023

The CBI is governed by its royal charter and by the CBI Council, which is able to delegate many of its roles to the Chairs' Committee and Board. Final policy positions are mandated by the CBI Chairs' Committee, which has a seat for all of the chairs of its regional and national councils and subject-based policy standing committees, SME Council and Trade Association Council. The Chairs' Committee Committee meets following each Standing Committee and Regional Council round.

The CBI's strategic and financial decisions are decided on by the CBI Board, which is chaired by the CBI President and includes the support and guidance of 4 other non-executives. Day-to-day management of the CBI is in the hands of the Director-General supported by a Management Board, made up of a number of CBI directors.

A President's Committee, made up of members, advises the president. The president, with the approval of the Chairs' Committee (under its delegated powers), appoints the director-general, who is responsible for the management of the CBI.

It has offices based in every region of the UK, including teams in Scotland, Northern Ireland and Wales, along with offices in Washington D.C, New Delhi, Beijing and Brussels. In March 2014 it moved its headquarters from Centre Point, London, to offices in Cannon Place, above Cannon Street railway station in the City of London.

History
The organisation was formed in 1965 out of a merger of the Federation of British Industries (known as FBI), the British Employers' Confederation and the National Association of British Manufacturers.

The CBI opened an office in Brussels in 1971, to open up opportunities in Europe. International Offices have opened in Washington (2002), Beijing (2005) and New Delhi (2011).

Research 
The CBI conducts numerous surveys that are of particular use to its members and stakeholders. Research is available to the relevant sections of its membership.
The CBI's surveys are currently:

 Industrial Trends
 Distributive Trends
 Service Sector
 Financial Sector
 SME Trends
 Investment Intentions
Occasional surveys include:
 Procurement
 London Business
 Education and Skills
 Absence

CBI policy is decided through consultation with its members – companies from all sectors and sizes of business across the UK are directly involved in the policy-making process.
The CBI publishes numerous reports each year on a wide range of issues that of interest and relevance to its members. Recent campaigns include "Future Champions", promoting the contribution and role of mid-sized businesses and "Industrial Futures", looking at how government should intervene in the economy to promote growth.
The CBI publishes ‘Business Voice’, a monthly magazine for its membership and ‘Intelligence FIRST’, an occasional publication providing strategic guidance for members on regulatory and economic change.

The Great Business Debate 
In September 2014, the CBI started The Great Business Debate campaign aimed at increasing public confidence in business. Survey data found that only around 50% of people in the UK think that business contributes positively to society and the campaign was initiated to play a part in increasing that figure. A website and social media channels have been set up to openly promote the contribution business makes whilst enabling people and organisations to give their opinions on this. It is planned that various events and other occurrences will take place across the UK as part of the campaign.

Scottish independence referendum controversy 

In April 2014, the CBI registered with the Electoral Commission as a backer of the campaign against Scottish independence.

As a result, 15 Scottish members (Scottish Enterprise, Visit Scotland, Highlands and Islands Enterprise, Skills Development Scotland, the Scottish Qualifications Authority, STV, the Law Society of Scotland, Aquamarine Power, Balhousie Care Group and the universities of Aberdeen, Edinburgh, Glasgow, Strathclyde, Heriot Watt and Glasgow Caledonian) resigned from the organisation, while two others, Robert Gordon University and Dundee University, suspended their membership.

The BBC announced on 24 April that it would also suspend its membership from 30 May until after the referendum on 18 September.

On 25 April, the CBI announced it would try to nullify its registration. An Electoral Commission spokesman said: "We have received representations from the CBI to de-register. We are currently considering whether this is possible under the relevant legislation and will make our reasoning public when we have reached a conclusion and informed the CBI of our decision." However, the chairman of Business for Scotland disputed this would be possible: "Our understanding is that the CBI cannot nullify its Electoral Commission registration and must, having been identified as a campaigning organisation, be policed by the Commission during the referendum campaign period, just as we are ourselves will be."

Organisation

Senior personnel 

 Brian McBride, President
 Lord Karan Bilimoria, Vice President
 Tony Danker, Director-General

List of former directors-general 

 John Davies (30 July 1965 – 15 October 1969)
 Sir Campbell Adamson (15 October 1969 – 2 July 1976)
 Sir John Methven (2 July 1976 – 23 April 1980) (died in office)
 Sir Terence Beckett (1 October 1980 – 26 March 1987)
 Sir John Banham (26 March 1987 – 26 June 1992)
 Sir Howard Davies, (29 June 1992 – 31 December 1995)
 Adair Turner (1 January 1995 – 31 December 2000)
 Sir Digby Jones (1 January 2001 – 30 June 2006)
 Sir Richard Lambert (1 July 2006 – 30 January 2011)
 John Cridland (31 January 2011 – October 2015)
 Dame Carolyn Fairbairn (01 November 2015 – 6 December 2020)

See also
British Chambers of Commerce
Federation of Small Businesses
TheCityUK

References

External links

Catalogue of the CBI archives, held at the Modern Records Centre, University of Warwick

Trade associations based in the United Kingdom
Organizations established in 1965
Industry in the United Kingdom
1965 establishments in the United Kingdom
Business organisations based in London